Philippa Jane Rogerson is a British solicitor and academic who has been Master of Gonville and Caius College, Cambridge since 2018. She is Professor of Private International Law at the University of Cambridge, where her research covers the conflict of laws and company law. In 2017, she was a member of the university's council.

Rogerson studied economics and law at Newnham College, Cambridge, receiving a BA in 1983, and went on to be admitted as a solicitor in 1986, working for Clifford Chance. She became a fellow of Caius in 1989 and was awarded a PhD in 1990 for a thesis titled Intangible property in the conflict of laws.

In May 2017, the college announced that Rogerson had been elected the next master of Gonville and Caius, succeeding Sir Alan Fersht when he retired in September 2018. She is the college's first female master, and was installed as such on 1 October 2018.

Selected works

References

External links 
College profile
Faculty profile
University profile

Living people
English legal scholars
English legal writers
Conflict of laws scholars
Fellows of Gonville and Caius College, Cambridge
Masters of Gonville and Caius College, Cambridge
Academics of the University of Cambridge
Year of birth missing (living people)